The Royal Thai General System of Transcription (RTGS) is the official system for rendering Thai words in the Latin alphabet. It was published by the Royal Institute of Thailand.

It is used in road signs and government publications and is the closest method to a standard of transcription for Thai, but its use, even by the government, is inconsistent. The system is almost identical to the one that is defined by ISO 11940-2.

Features
Prominent features of the system are:
It uses only unmodified letters from the Latin alphabet without diacritics.
 It uses consonants as in IPA except as follows:

Final consonants are transcribed according to pronunciation, not Thai orthography.

Vowels are transcribed in the position in the word where they are pronounced, not as in Thai orthography. Implied vowels, which are not written in Thai orthography, are transcribed as pronounced.

A hyphen is used to avoid ambiguity in syllable separation before a succeeding syllable that starts with a vowel and before  if the preceding syllable ends with a vowel.

Transcribed words are written with spaces between them although there are no spaces in Thai. For example, "สถาบันไทยคดีศึกษา" Institute of Thai Studies is transcribed as "Sathaban Thai Khadi Sueksa". However, compounds and names of persons are written without spaces between words. For example, "ลูกเสือ" (from "ลูก" + "เสือ", scout) is transcribed as "luksuea", not "luk suea", and "โชคชัย จิตงาม", the first and last names of a person, is transcribed as "Chokchai Chitngam", not "Chok Chai Chit Ngam".

Transcription table
For consonants, the transcriptions are given for both initial and final position in the syllable. For vowels, a dash ("–") indicates the relative position of the vowel's initial consonant.

History
There have been four versions of the RTGS, those promulgated in 1932, 1939, 1968 and 1999. The general system was issued by the Ministry of Public Instruction in 1932, and subsequent issues have been issued by the Royal Institute of Thailand.

Table of changes

1932 version
The general system was set up by a committee of the Ministry of Public Instruction on the following principles:
 The general system should be expandable to the precise system.
 The general system should be based on pronunciation, and one sound should be represented by one symbol or letter.
 The general system should be in consonance with the principles of Thai grammar, orthography, and pronunciation.
 In selecting symbols or letters, account should be taken of existing types for printing and typewriting and of existing systems of transcription.

The committee considered that for the general system, tone and quantity marks were unneeded. They would be provided for the precise system. The marks are accents above the vowels, one reason that the vowel symbols used to have no marks above them.

1939 version
The 1939 issue allowed short vowels to be marked with a breve (˘) where expedient.  By contrast, the ALA-LC transliteration uses the 1939 version with the addition of a macron (¯) for long vowels and a spiritus asper (ʽ) to transliterate อ  as a consonant.

The changes in vowel notation copied existing usage (æ, œ)
and IPA notation (æ, ǫ).

Relationship to precise system
The precise system was issued along with the general system in 1939.  A transliteration in the precise system could be converted to the general system by doing the following:
 Removing parenthesised character
 Replacing ʽ and hʽ by h
 Removing length and tone markings
 Removing ḥ, which corresponds to ะ , which may be viewed as a length mark
 Removing the character distinguishing dots below and primes
 Changing ay and aiy to ai except before vowels
 Changing č to čh
 Changing ie to ia, uo to ua and ưœ to ưa

The last set of changes removes a graphic distinction between vowels in closed syllables and vowels in open syllables.

The h is added to č in the general system to make it easier to read.

1968 version
The 1968 version removed diacritics, including the horn of ư and replaced the ligatures æ and œ by ae and oe. While that is more suitable as the standard transliteration for maps, it removed the contrast between the transcriptions of จ  and ช , อึ  and อุ , เอือ  and อัว , and โอ  and ออ .

1999 version
The 1999 version restored the distinction between the transcriptions of the pairs อึ  and อุ  and เอือ  and อัว . It also simplified the transliteration of final ว , which now is always transcribed <o>.

Allowed variants
The following variants have been allowed:

Criticism
The system does not transcribe all features of Thai phonology. Particularly it has the following shortcomings:
 It does not record tones.
 It does not differentiate between short and long vowels.
 The notation  does not differentiate between IPA  and IPA  (see table below). Using  for  would have been more consistent with the other stops and is used as such in ISO 11940-2.
 The notation  does not differentiate between IPA  and IPA  (see table below).

The original design envisioned the general system to give broad details of pronunciation, and the precise system to supplement that with vowel lengths, tones, and specific Thai characters used.

See also
 ISO 11940
 ISO 11940-2
 Thai transliteration

References

Sources

External links
 Discussion of romanisation (Microsoft Word document)
 Downloadable Windows-based transcription tool
 ALA-LC: PDF guide to romanization of Thai (U.S.A. library of Congress)

1932 establishments in Siam
Romanization of Thai
Thai culture
Royal Society of Thailand